Second Lieutenant Frederick William Fout (October 30, 1839 or 1840 – June 6, 1905) was a German soldier who fought in the American Civil War. Fout received the United States' highest award for bravery during combat, the Medal of Honor, for his action near Harpers Ferry in West Virginia on September 15, 1862. He was honored with the award on November 2, 1896.

Biography
Fout was born in Meissen, Germany, on October 30, 1839 (according to some accounts), as Friedrich Wilhelm Fout. Other sources state he was born in 1840. At about age 15, Fout left Germany for the United States, where he stayed with an uncle in New Palestine, Indiana, anglicizing his name to Frederick William upon entry. 

A carpenter at the outbreak of the war, Fout first enlisted for a three-month service with the 7th Indiana Infantry Regiment in April 1861. After involvement in the Battle of Philippi (West Virginia), and the Battle of Laurel Hill his company was mustered out in August of that year. Fout re-enlisted into the Indiana Light Artillery. It was during his service in this regiment that he performed the act of gallantry that earned him the Medal of Honor. He was promoted to first lieutenant in January 1864 and put in command of his battery. In his personal papers, William Tecumseh Sherman mentioned that Fout's battery fired the first shell into Atlanta.

Fout officially became an American citizen in 1865. Following the war, Fout moved to New York, where he married his former schoolteacher's daughter. After moving to Indianapolis, he started a glass manufacturing business. Several years later, he moved to St. Louis, Missouri, continuing his trade there. In his later life he moved into pensions and claims and also constructing houses.

He died on 6 June 1905 and his remains are interred at the Bellefontaine Cemetery in St. Louis, Missouri.

Medal of Honor citation

See also

List of American Civil War Medal of Honor recipients: A–F

References

External links
 

Date of birth uncertain
1905 deaths
German-born Medal of Honor recipients
German emigrants to the United States
People of Indiana in the American Civil War
Union Army officers
United States Army Medal of Honor recipients
American Civil War recipients of the Medal of Honor
People from Meissen
People from New Palestine, Indiana
People from Indianapolis
Military personnel from St. Louis